The North-Western Territory was a region of British North America extant until 1870 and named for where it lay in relation to Rupert's Land.

Due to the lack of development, exploration, and cartographic limits of the time, the exact boundaries, ownership, and administration of the region were not precisely defined when the territory was extant. There is also not a definitive date when the British first asserted sovereignty over the territory. Maps vary in defining the boundaries of the territory; however, in modern usage, the region is generally accepted to be the region bounded by modern-day British Columbia, the continental divide with Rupert's Land, Russian America (later Alaska), and the Arctic Ocean. The territory covered what is now the Yukon, mainland Northwest Territories, northwestern mainland Nunavut, northwestern Saskatchewan, and northern Alberta. Northern modern-day British Columbia is sometimes also considered to have been part of the territory as well.

The North-Western Territory was not technically within the area of land granted to the Hudson's Bay Company in May 1670, as the region did not drain into Hudson's Bay. However, the Hudson's Bay Company (HBC) was still the de facto administrator of the region and the territory was included in the same process of transferring Rupert's Land to Canada from the HBC, effective on July 15, 1870.

History

It is obscure when exactly the United Kingdom first asserted sovereignty over the territory; however, after France accepted British sovereignty over the Hudson Bay coast by the Treaty of Utrecht (1713), the UK was the only European power with practical access to that part of the continent. The Hudson's Bay Company, despite the royal charter assigning only Rupert's Land to the company, had long used the region as part of its trading area. The North West Company also hunted and trapped on the land and this led to frequent conflicts between the companies. To ease tensions, the UK government assigned administrative duties to the HBC, while still allowing The North West Company to hunt on the lands with the passage of "An act for regulating the fur trade, and establishing a criminal and civil jurisdiction within certain parts of North America", in 1821. As well, large areas of Rupert's Land were not accurately mapped then to know the precise boundaries. The British made almost no effort to assert sovereignty over the aboriginal peoples of the area. In accordance with the Royal Proclamation of 1763, large-scale settlement by non-aboriginal people was prohibited until the lands were surrendered by treaty.

In 1862 during the Stikine Gold Rush, part of the North-Western Territory became the Stickeen (Stikine) Territory when the Stikine became inundated by American miners and, to prevent any resulting American claims to or agitation for the region, Governor James Douglas of the Vancouver Island and British Columbia colonies declared the area a British territory. The coastal area at the mouth of the Stikine was part of Russian America at the time, but the British had rights of free navigation to the Stikine by treaties in 1825 and 1839 as well as a lease of coastal lands to the south of it. The boundary of the North-Western Territory in this region, and likewise the Stickeen Territories created from it, south of and northwards from the Stikine, had been set as "ten marine leagues" from the sea, but this remained undefined until the Alaska Boundary Settlement of 1903.  The North-Western Territory's boundary with Russian America north of the 60th Parallel had been set at the 141st line of longitude by the Treaty of St. Petersburg in 1825.
The year following the creation of the Stickeen Territories, part of the Stikine returned to the North-Western Territory when boundaries were adjusted and the Colony of British Columbia was extended to the 60th parallel north, a measure which also brought into British Columbia its portion of the Peace River Block, which had not been part of the Stikine Territory. In 1868, shortly after Canadian Confederation, the Hudson's Bay Company agreed to surrender its vast territories to the new dominion. However, it was not until July 15, 1870, that the transfer to Canada was made. On that date the North-Western Territory became part of the newly created Northwest Territories (often stylized as the North-West Territories). In 1880, the British Arctic Territories were claimed by Canada and later formed the Northwest Territories and Nunavut.  In 1898 the Yukon Territory was formed when the areas west of the Mackenzie Mountains were removed from the Northwest Territories during the Klondike Gold Rush, again as with the Stickeen Territory to prevent efforts at American takeover and also to enable easier governance.

See also

Former colonies and territories in Canada
Territorial evolution of Canada after 1867
Stikine Territory
History of Canada
Alaska boundary dispute

References

External links 
Rupert's Land and North-Western Territory Order

 
Hudson's Bay Company
History of the Northwest Territories
British North America
British colonization of the Americas
States and territories disestablished in 1870